Tina Križan and Katarina Srebotnik were the defending champions, but lost in semifinals to tournament winners Silvia Farina and Rita Grande.

Silvia Farina and Rita Grande won the title by defeating Ruxandra Dragomir and Virginia Ruano Pascual 6–4, 0–6, 7–6(8–6) in the final.

Seeds

Draw

Draw

References

 Official results archive (ITF)
 Official results archive (WTA)

Internazionali Femminili di Palermo - Doubles
2000 Doubles